Josephine Faniella Henny Klein (17 October 1926 – 13 November 2018), was a German-born British psychologist and psychotherapist.

References

1926 births
2018 deaths
British psychologists
British psychotherapists
German emigrants to the United Kingdom